The 1920 Woodbridge by-election was held on 28 July 1920.  The by-election was held due to the resignation of the incumbent Coalition Unionist MP, Robert Francis Peel.  It was won by the Coalition Unionist candidate Sir Arthur Churchman.

Vacancy
The by-election was caused by the sitting Unionist MP, Robert Francis Peel resigning his seat to become Governor and Commander-in-Chief of St Helena. He had been MP here since re-gaining the seat from the Liberals in January 1910.

Electoral history
The constituency was a Unionist/Liberal marginal. Since the seat's creation in 1885, it had been won by a Unionist candidate six times and by a Liberal three times. The Coalition Government 'Coupon' at the last General Election in 1918 was awarded to the sitting Unionist rather than the Liberal challenger. Despite this, the Liberal vote held up very well;

Candidates
The Unionists selected 53-year-old tobacco manufacturer Sir Arthur Churchman as their candidate to defend the seat.
The Liberal candidate from the last election, Rowley Elliston did not stand this time, despite his good showing in 1918. In fact, no Liberal candidate came forward.
The Labour Party, who had not contested the seat before, selected 46-year-old H.D. Harben, a former Liberal candidate, as their candidate to challenge for the seat. He had contested the 1906 general election at Worcester coming second. He then contested the dual member seat of Portsmouth at the December 1910 general election, coming fourth.

Campaign
Polling Day was set for 28 July 1920. Nominations closed to confirm that the election would be a two-way contest. Churchman received the official endorsement of the Coalition Government.

Result

Aftermath
The result at the following General Election in 1922 was;

See also
 List of United Kingdom by-elections

References

1920 elections in the United Kingdom
1920 in England
Suffolk Coastal
Woodbridge, Suffolk
Woodbridge